The Montpelier Bridge is a semi-monthly paper covering the Montpelier, Vermont area.

History 
The paper was founded in 1993 by Nat Frothingham, Phil Dodd, Jake Brown, J. Gregory Gerdel, and numerous volunteers including consultation by Daniel A. Neary, Jr. as the non-profit Montpelier Community Newspaper Association, Inc. It later transitioned to a private business, co-owned by Jake Brown and Nat Frothingham. Jake Brown left the paper in 2004. In 2018, Mike Dunphy replaced Frothingham as editor-in-chief. Mara Brooks replaced Dunphy in early 2020, but left in May 2020 to be replaced by former managing editor Carla (Neary)Occaso.

The paper nearly folded after the Great Recession of 2008. In 2015, Publisher Nat Frothingham, Managing Editor Carla Occaso, Designer Marichel Vaught, and Ad Sales Rep Michael Jermyn petitioned to get The Bridge on the City ballot in order to get appropriation of Montpelier city funds to keep the paper afloat, but City Council voted it down. So they embarked on a Kickstarter campaign to raise enough money to pay off back printing bills and unpaid employee bills dating back to the 2009 economic downturn. Frothingham also asked readers to contribute funds, including Montpelier Mayor John Hollar, who donated, calling the paper a "labor of love."  In 2016 the paper transitioned back into a not-for-profit paper. The 2020 pandemic also caused a shakeup, in which two key employees left, but veteran Bridge board members and former employees stepped in to cover the COVID 19 pandemic, anti-racism resurgence, a new police chief, new restaurants, and all the issues concerning Montpelier, Vt. with renewed vigor. They all apparently agree with former Mayor John Hollar that community news is a labor of love.

The paper was commended by the Vermont Senate in 2014 and by the Vermont House of Representatives in 2018.

References 

Semi-monthly newspapers
Montpelier, Vermont
Newspapers published in Vermont
Publications established in 1993